Kamand (also Kmaand, Hindi: कमान्द) is a small village in Development Block Mandi-Sadr, Mandi district, Himachal Pradesh, India. The village is situated on the left bank of the Uhl River. The South Campus of IIT Mandi borders Kamand and the entrance to the campus branches off from MDR23 here. The Kamand Gram Panchayat is a local self-governance body that covers Kamand and 6 other villages.

Description 

Crops grown in surrounding farms include corn, wheat, potato, red kidney beans (rajma), black-eyed peas (rongi).  A number of businesses cater to the IIT Mandi community.  These include provision and supply shops, restaurants, petrol bunk, services, lodges for students, staff and contractors, etc.  Kamand has a Sub Post Office (Delivery Office) with pincode 175075.

History 
Until 2010, Kamand was a small agrarian village with traditional houses built of dry stone walls and slate roofs.  During 2010–2020, with the development of IIT Mandi, Kamand has grown rapidly and now has many multi-storey cement concrete buildings.  Several businesses have blossomed, catering to the construction and other needs of IIT Mandi and to the students and campus residents.

Demographics 
The population as of the 2011 Census was 29 with 8 households.  Scheduled Castes comprise between 11 and 20% and Scheduled Tribes between 31 and 40%.  The main religions are Hinduism.  The languages are Mandeali and Hindi.  A small but growing number of people are able to converse in English due to the influence of the diverse IIT Mandi community.

Transport 
Public and private buses and private vans ply regularly between Mandi and various villages in the Kamand valley, passing through Kamand.  A few buses pass through en route from Mandi to Bajaura and Kullu.

Education 

A government primary, middle and secondary school caters to children from surrounding villages.  IIT Mandi is an institute of national importance offering bachelors, masters and PhD in engineering, and masters and PhD in sciences and humanities.  The South Campus of IIT Mandi borders Kamand.  Students come from all parts of India and from some foreign countries.

Governance (Gram Panchayat) 
The Kamand Gram Panchayat is a government office and local self-government body that governs the village of Kamand and 6 nearby villages in Mandi Sadar Development Block of District Mandi in the state of Himachal Pradesh, India. Kamand GP falls in the Darang Assembly Constituency and the Mandi Parliamentary Constituency. The 7 villages have a total population of 2,416 as of the 2011 Census.

Pradhans

Villages 
The Kamand Gram Panchayat covers 7 villages.

Gallery

See also 
 IIT Mandi

References 

Gram panchayats in Himachal Pradesh
Villages in Mandi district